Semioptila hyalina is a moth in the Himantopteridae family. It was described by George Talbot in 1926. It is found in Kasai-Oriental in the Democratic Republic of the Congo.

References

Moths described in 1926
Himantopteridae
Endemic fauna of the Democratic Republic of the Congo